The Mercuries Taiwan Masters (三商台灣名人賽) is an annual golf tournament held in Taiwan. It was founded in 1987 and has been an Asian Tour event since 2000.

Winners

See also
 List of sporting events in Taiwan

References

External links
Coverage on the Asian Tour's official site
Past winners

Asian Tour events
Golf tournaments in Taiwan
Autumn events in Taiwan
1987 establishments in Taiwan